Pilsbrycharopa tumida is a species of small air-breathing land snail, a terrestrial pulmonate gastropod mollusk in the family Charopidae. This species is endemic to Australia.

References

Gastropods of Australia
Pilsbrycharopa
Vulnerable fauna of Australia
Gastropods described in 1917
Taxonomy articles created by Polbot